Sinmun may refer to:

King 
Sinmun of Silla (r. 681–692), the thirty-first king of Silla, a Korean state that originated in the southwestern Korean peninsula

Newspaper 

Gyeongju Sinmun, weekly newspaper published in the city of Gyeongju, North Gyeongsang province, South Korea
Pyongyang Sinmun, North Korean newspaper founded on 1 June 1957 by Kim Il-sung
Rodong Sinmun, North Korean newspaper and the official newspaper of the Central Committee of the Workers' Party of Korea
Seoul Sinmun, daily newspaper based out of Seoul, South Korea
Tongnip Sinmun (1896–1899), the first privately managed modern daily newspaper in Korea founded by Seo Jae-pil